The Venturiaceae are a family of fungi in the order Pleosporales. Several of the species in this family are plant pathogens.

List of genera
As accepted by GBIF;

Acantharia  (7)
Antennaria  (2)
Antennularia  (1)
Anungitea  (30)
Anungitopsis  (9)
Aphysa (2)
Apiosporina  (5)
Arkoola  (1)
Arnaudia (1)
Asterula (3)
Atopospora  (4)
Botryostroma  (3)
Caproventuria  (1)
Coleroa  (31)
Crotone  (2)
Cylindrosympodioides (3)
Cylindrosympodium  (18)
Dictyodochium  (1)
Ectosticta (9)
Fusicladium  (112)
Gelatosphaera (2)
Gibbera  (50)
Karakulinia (1)
Lasiobotrys  (5)
Limacinia (6)
Lineostroma  (1)
Magnohelicospora  (2)
Maireella (1)
Metacoleroa  (1)
Monopus (1)
Montagnina (1)
Napicladium  (14)
Phaeosphaerella  (31)
Phaeosporella (1)
Phragmogibbera  (2)
Piggotia  (4)
Polyrhizon  (7)
Protoventuria  (20)
Pseudoanungitea  (3)
Pseudocladosporium  (3)
Pseudoparodiella  (1)
Pseudotthia (1)
Pyrenobotrys  (2)
Rhizogene  (2)
Rhizosphaera  (13)
Robledia (1)
Rosenscheldiella  (21)
Sivanesaniella  (1)
Spilocaea  (2)
Spilodochium  (4)
Spilosticta (8)
Stigmatea  (27)
Trichodothella  (2)
Trichodothis  (3)
Tyrannosorus  (1)
Uleodothis  (8)
Venturia  (206)
Xenomeris  (12)

Figures in brackets are approx. how many species per genus.

References

External links
Venturiaceae at Index Fungorum

 
Pleosporales
Dothideomycetes families